The 2013 Kazan Kremlin Cup was a professional tennis tournament played on indoor hard courts. It was the fourth edition of the tournament which was part of the 2013 ATP Challenger Tour. It took place in Kazan, Russia between 21 and 27 October 2013.

Singles main-draw entrants

Seeds

 Rankings are as of October 14, 2013.

Other entrants
The following players received wildcards into the singles main draw:
  Barış Ergüden
  Aslan Karatsev
  Timur Kiuamov
  Andrey Rublev

The following players received entry from the qualifying draw:
  Maxim Dubarenco
  Richard Muzaev
  Antal van der Duim
  Alexey Vatutin

The following players received entry as a lucky loser:
  Alexander Rumyantsev

Champions

Singles

 Oleksandr Nedovyesov def.  Andrey Golubev 6–4, 6–1

Doubles

 Radu Albot /  Farrukh Dustov def.  Egor Gerasimov /  Dzmitry Zhyrmont 6–2, 6–7(3–7), [10–7]

External links
Official Website
ATP official site

Kazan Kremlin Cup
2013
2013
Kazan Kremlin Cup
October 2013 sports events in Russia